Phú Bình may refer to several places in Vietnam, including:

Phú Bình District, a rural district of Thái Nguyên Province
Phú Bình, Huế, a ward of Huế
Phú Bình, Long Khánh, a ward of Long Khánh in Đồng Nai Province
Phú Bình, An Giang, a commune of Phú Tân District, An Giang
Phú Bình, Tân Phú, a commune of Tân Phú District, Đồng Nai
Phú Bình, Tuyên Quang, a commune of Chiêm Hóa District